The Song of Bernadette is a 1943 American biographical drama film based on the 1941 novel of the same name by Franz Werfel. It stars Jennifer Jones in the title role, which portrays the story of Bernadette Soubirous, who reportedly experienced eighteen visions of the Blessed Virgin Mary from February to July 1858 and was canonized in 1933. The film was directed by Henry King, from a screenplay by George Seaton.

The novel was extremely popular, spending more than a year on The New York Times Best Seller list and thirteen weeks heading the list. The story was also turned into a Broadway play, which opened at the Belasco Theatre in March 1946.

Plot 
In 1858, 14-year-old Bernadette Soubirous lives in poverty with her family in Lourdes, France. She is shamed by her Catholic school teacher, Sister Vauzou for falling behind in her studies because of her asthma. That afternoon, while fetching firewood with her sister Marie and a friend, Bernadette waits for them in the Massabielle grotto. Distracted by a strange breeze and a change in the light, Bernadette sees a beautiful lady clad in white, standing on a rock niche. Bernadette tells her companions what she saw, and they promise not to tell anyone else. However, Marie tells their mother when they return home, and the story soon spreads all over Lourdes.

Many, including Bernadette's Aunt Bernarde, are convinced of her sincerity, standing up for her against her disbelieving parents. Bernadette, continues to repeatedly visit the grotto as requested by the lady, accompanied by other citizens of Lourdes. While Abbé Dominique Peyramale refuses to get involved; civil authorities threateningly interrogate Bernadette, but she confounds them with her simplicity and stands behind her story. On one visit, the lady asks Bernadette to drink and wash at a seemingly nonexistent spring. Bernadette obediently digs a hole in the ground and smears her face with dirt. Though she is initially ridiculed, water later begins to flow, which exhibits miraculous healing properties; and ailing people soon begin flocking to Lourdes.

On Bernadette’s last visit to the grotto, the lady finally identifies herself as the "Immaculate Conception." When civil authorities try to have Bernadette declared insane, Peyramale, who once doubted her, now becomes her staunchest ally and asks for a formal church investigation to verify if Bernadette is a fraud, insane, or genuine.

The grotto is fenced off, and the Bishop of Tarbes declares that unless the Emperor orders the grotto to open, there will be no investigation. When The Emperor’s infant son is cured of his illness by water from Lourdes, the Empress demands that the grotto be reopened. The Bishop of Tarbes then directs the commission to convene. The investigation takes many years, and Bernadette is questioned again and again, but the commission eventually determines that Bernadette truly experienced the visions and was visited by the Virgin Mary.

Believing it unsuitable for her to live an ordinary life, Peyramale persuades Bernadette to join the Sisters of Charity of Nevers. Bernadette undergoes rigorous spiritual training and works hard at the convent; but is also subjected to emotional abuse from Sister Vauzou, now mistress of novices at the convent. Vauzou tells Bernadette that doubt consumes her, and that she cannot believe that Bernadette, who has never suffered, would be chosen by God when she has spent her life suffering in his service. 
 
Though Bernadette agrees that she has not suffered, she then reveals a tumor hidden under the skirt of her habit, much to Vauzou’s horror. The doctor diagnoses tuberculosis of the bone; the condition causes unspeakable pain, yet Bernadette had never mentioned it. Vauzou, realizing her error, prays for forgiveness and vows to serve Bernadette for the rest of her life. Despite the severity of her illness, Bernadette adamantly denies partaking of the grotto’s healing waters.

On her deathbed, Bernadette sends for Peyramale and confesses her feelings of unworthiness while sorrowfully maintaining that she may never see the lady again. However, the lady appears in the room, smiles, and gestures to Bernadette warmly. Bernadette joyfully cries out to the apparition before finally dying. Upon her death, Peyramale remarks, "You are now in Heaven and on earth. Your life begins, O Bernadette."

Cast

 Jennifer Jones as Bernadette Soubirous
 Charles Bickford as Abbé Dominique Peyramale
 William Eythe as Antoine Nicoleau
 Gladys Cooper as Marie Therese Vauzou, Bernadette's schoolteacher and later the Mistress of Novices
 Vincent Price as Vital Dutour,  Imperial Prosecutor
 Lee J. Cobb as Dr. Dozous
 Anne Revere as Louise Casterot Soubirous, Bernadette's mother
 Roman Bohnen as François Soubirous, Bernadette's father
 Mary Anderson as Jeanne Abadie, Bernadette's friend
 Patricia Morison as Empress Eugenie
 Jerome Cowan as Emperor Napoleon III
 Aubrey Mather as Mayor Lacade
 Charles Dingle as Jacomet, chief of police
 Edith Barrett as Croisine Bouhouhorts
 Sig Ruman as Louis Bouriette
 Blanche Yurka as Bernarde Casterot, Bernadette's aunt
 Ermadean Walters as Marie Soubirous, Bernadette's sister
 Marcel Dalio as Callet
 Pedro de Cordoba as Dr. LeCramps
 Fortunio Bonanova as Imperial Prince Louis (uncredited)
 Harry Cording as Stonemason (uncredited)
 Linda Darnell as the Immaculate Conception (uncredited)
 Alan Napier as Dr. Debeau, the psychiatrist (uncredited)
 Frank Reicher as Dr. St. Cyr (uncredited)
 Edward Van Sloan as Doctor (uncredited)

Historical accuracy
The film's plot follows the novel by Franz Werfel, which is not a documentary but a historical novel blending fact and fiction.  Bernadette's real-life friend Antoine Nicolau is portrayed as being deeply in love with her and vowing to remain unmarried when Bernadette enters the convent.  No such relationship is documented as existing between them. In addition, the government authorities, in particular, Imperial Prosecutor Vital Dutour (played by Vincent Price) are portrayed as being much more anti-religion than they actually were; in fact, Dutour was himself a devout Catholic who simply thought Bernadette was hallucinating. Other portrayals come closer to historical accuracy, particularly Anne Revere and Roman Bohnen as Bernadette's overworked parents, Charles Bickford as Father Peyramale  (although his presence at Bernadette's deathbed was an artistic embellishment; in reality, Peyramale had died a few years before Bernadette), and Blanche Yurka as formidable Aunt Bernarde.

The portrayal of Sister Marie Therese Vauzou is also inaccurate.  There is no evidence that Sister Vazou was Bernadette’s elementary school teacher or that they met prior to the time that Bernanette entered the convent.

The film combines the characters of Vital Dutour and the man of letters Hyacinthe de La Fite, who appears in the novel and believes he has cancer of the larynx. La Fite does not appear at all in the movie. In the film, it is Dutour who is dying of cancer of the larynx at the end, and who goes to the Lourdes shrine, kneels at the gates to the grotto and says, "Pray for me, Bernadette."

The film ends with the death of Bernadette and does not mention the exhumation of her body or her canonization, as the novel does.

Music
Igor Stravinsky was initially informally approached to write the film score.  On 15 February 1943, he started writing music for the "Apparition of the Virgin" scene.  However, the studio never approved a contract with Stravinsky, and the project went to Alfred Newman, who won an Oscar.  The music Stravinsky had written for the film made its way into the second movement of his Symphony in Three Movements.

Reception
Bosley Crowther of The New York Times gave the movie a mostly negative review, praising the acting, especially Jones's, but regretting the movie's "tedious and repetitious" narrative, its emphasis on "images that lack visual mobility" and "dialectic discourse that will clutter and fatigue the average mind," and the decision to make Bernadette's "lady" visible to viewers.

Awards and nominations

Also, the film is recognized by American Film Institute in these lists:
 2005: AFI's 100 Years of Film Scores – Nominated
 2006: AFI's 100 Years...100 Cheers – Nominated

Radio adaptation
The Song of Bernadette was presented on Hollywood Star Time 21 April 1946. The 30-minute adaptation starred Vincent Price, Lee J. Cobb, Pedro DeCordoba, and Vanessa Brown.

See also
 Lourdes apparitions
 "Song of Bernadette" (song)
 The Village of St. Bernadette

References

Further reading
 John Bear, The Number One New York Times Best Seller, Berkeley: Ten Speed Press, 1992.

External links

 
 
 
 
 
 

1943 films
1940s biographical drama films
20th Century Fox films
American biographical drama films
American black-and-white films
Best Drama Picture Golden Globe winners
Films scored by Alfred Newman
Films about Catholic nuns
Films about Christianity
Films about religion
Films about Catholicism
Films based on Austrian novels
Films directed by Henry King
Films featuring a Best Actress Academy Award-winning performance
Films featuring a Best Drama Actress Golden Globe-winning performance
Films set in France
Films set in the 1850s
Films set in the 1860s
Films set in the 1870s
Films that won the Best Original Score Academy Award
Films whose art director won the Best Art Direction Academy Award
Films whose cinematographer won the Best Cinematography Academy Award
Films whose director won the Best Director Golden Globe
Our Lady of Lourdes
Marian apparitions in film
Cultural depictions of Napoleon III
1943 drama films
Films produced by William Perlberg
1940s English-language films
1940s American films